"Song for a Summer Night" is a song written by Robert Allen and performed by Mitch Miller and His Orchestra and Chorus.  It reached #8 on the U.S. pop chart in 1956.

The B-side of the single is the vocal version of the song.

The song was introduced on Westinghouse Studio One Summer Theatre.

Other versions
Johnny Brandon released a version of the song as the B-side to his 1956 single "Glendora".
Jack Nitzsche released a version of the song as a single in 1963, but it did not chart.  It was produced by Jimmy Bowen.

References

Songs about music
Songs about nights
1956 songs
1956 singles
1963 singles
Songs with music by Robert Allen (composer)
Song recordings produced by Jimmy Bowen
Columbia Records singles